Evalar is a Russian company producing dietary supplements. As of 2014, it held the largest share – 17% – of Russia's dietary supplements market. Commercial and plantation of medicinal herbs Evalar located in the Altai Krai. Headquarters — in Biysk.

History 
The company was established in 1991 on the basis of Altai Research Institute of Chemical Technology. The original institute was a Soviet defence industry establishment producing gas coolers for the military. As the Soviet Union collapsed and the state enterprises were privatized, Larisa Prokopieva, who at the time headed one of the departments of the Institute, converted its facilities, originally to produce bubble gum, then cosmetics, and later, dietary supplements.

References

External links
 Official site
 Forbes 05/2005. Край земли: Экономически активные

Companies based in Altai Krai
Pharmaceutical companies of Russia
Russian brands